Kenneth R. Weinstein (born November 4, 1961) is the Walter P. Stern Distinguished Fellow at Hudson Institute, a conservative Washington-based policy research organization. From 2005, he served as CEO of Hudson Institute, and from April 2011 until January 2021 was Hudson's President and CEO. Weinstein has been noted as an expert on U.S. foreign policy and international affairs who has commented on national and international affairs on television and in numerous publications, including The Wall Street Journal, The Weekly Standard, Yomiuri Shimbun and Le Monde.

Career 
Weinstein began his career as a researcher at Hudson Institute, before taking positions at the New Citizenship Project, the Shalem Center and the Heritage Foundation. He rejoined Hudson in 1999, serving as director of Hudson's Washington office and its COO before taking over as CEO in 2005. Under Weinstein's leadership, Hudson Institute grew significantly in size and impact, building ties to elected and appointed officials on both sides of the aisle in the US and around the world and becoming one of Washington's most influential think tanks. During his tenure as President and CEO, Hudson nearly tripled its annual budget to $20 million and quintupled its endowment to $60 million. Among the many noted experts Weinstein recruited to Hudson are Walter Russell Mead, Michael Pillsbury, H. R. McMaster, Elaine Chao, Nadia Schadlow, Patrick Cronin and Christopher DeMuth.

In addition to his work at Hudson Institute, Weinstein was nominated by President Bush and confirmed by the US Senate in 2006 to serve on the National Council for the Humanities, the board which oversees the National Endowment for the Humanities. In 2013, he was nominated by President Obama to serve on the Broadcasting Board of Governors (now the U.S. Agency for Global Media), the agency which oversees Voice of America, Radio Free Europe/Radio Liberty, Radio Free Asia, and other government broadcasting programs. Weinstein was later elected by his fellow governors as chairman of the BBG in 2017, a position in which he served until 2020. In September 2018, he was appointed to the Advisory Committee for Trade Policy and Negotiations by President Trump.

Nomination as U.S. Ambassador to Japan 

On March 13, 2020, President Donald Trump announced his intent to nominate Weinstein as the next U.S. Ambassador to Japan. Given Weinstein's policy expertise, his nomination received strong bipartisan support, including from the U.S. Chamber of Commerce, former Vice Presidents Walter Mondale and Dan Quayle, former Directors of National Intelligence Dan Coats and Dennis Blair, and former UN ambassador Nikki Haley, as well as noted Asia policy experts Kurt Campbell, Michael Green, and Joseph Nye. Weinstein was introduced at his Senate Foreign Relations Committee nomination hearing by former Senator Joseph Lieberman, who noted Weinstein "has developed not only a great knowledge of [the] U.S.–Japanese relationship, but very deep friendships and trusting relationships within Japan, both in the government and in the business community." Weinstein's testimony focused on the strategic convergence between the U.S. and Japan in the Abe-Trump era, and on the need for increased defense and technological cooperation to meet the challenge posed by the People's Republic of China.

Weinstein received unanimous support from the Senate Foreign Relations Committee, which voted him out of committee on September 22, 2020. Following the committee vote, Weinstein was praised by Japanese Chief Cabinet Secretary Katsunobu Kato for having "built personal connections with a wide range of Japanese stakeholders, both public and private," noting, "I expect his official appointment will greatly contribute to the even further development of U.S.–Japan relations." Due to debate in the Senate over Ruth Bader Ginsburg's replacement on the Supreme Court, and the November 2020 election, no non-career nominee for a U.S. ambassadorship was able to be confirmed in the fall of 2020. Weinstein's nomination lapsed at the end of the 116th Congress.

Personal life
Weinstein is a political theorist who received his Bachelor of Arts in General Studies in the Humanities from the University of Chicago, his Master of Philosophy in Soviet and Eastern European studies from the Institut d'Etudes Politiques de Paris and his Doctor of Philosophy in political science from Harvard University. He grew up in Rego Park, Queens and attended Stuyvesant High School. He has taught at Claremont McKenna College and Georgetown University.

Weinstein, who speaks French and German, has been decorated with a knighthood in Arts and Letters by the French Ministry of Culture and Communication as a Chevalier dans l'Ordre des Arts et des Lettres. Married to Amy Kauffman, and the father of three, he lives in Washington, D.C. He is a member of Kesher Israel Synagogue.

Selected publications

References

External links
 
 Speech introducing Henry Kissinger before 2015 Hudson Institute Global Leadership Award Dinner
 Interview with Wolf Blitzer regarding Russian hacking attempts

American political writers
American male non-fiction writers
Stuyvesant High School alumni
Harvard University alumni
University of Chicago alumni
Georgetown University faculty
Living people
20th-century American Jews
American chief executives
Hudson Institute
Sciences Po alumni
Claremont McKenna College faculty
1961 births
21st-century American Jews